Leroy V. Quintana (born June 10, 1944 in Albuquerque, New Mexico) is an American poet, and Vietnam Veteran.

Life
He was raised in small northern New Mexico towns such as Ratón and Questa. 
He was drafted in the United States Army in 1967, and served in the 101st Airborne Division. He was deployed to Vietnam during the Vietnam War.

He graduated from University of New Mexico, and New Mexico State University with an M.A. in 1974.
He teaches at San Diego Mesa College.

His work has appeared in Ploughshares, Prairie Schooner, Progressive, Puerto del Sol.

Awards
 1982 American Book Award for Paper Dance: 55 Latino Poets
 1993 American Book Award for The History of Home

Works
"Hopper"; "Brownie"; "A Restaurant in Munich",  Viet Nam Generation Journal & Newsletter V3, N3 (November 1991)

Short Stories

Editor

Anthologies

References

External links
"Leroy V. Quintana", Vietnam Veterans History Project
"Five Poems About Vietnam", American Experience

1944 births
Living people
Writers from Albuquerque, New Mexico
American male poets
University of New Mexico alumni
New Mexico State University alumni
San Diego Mesa College faculty
United States Army personnel of the Vietnam War
American Book Award winners
United States Army soldiers